John Clarke Hardie (born 7 February 1938) is a Scottish footballer, who played as a goalkeeper in the Football League for Oldham Athletic, Chester and Bradford Park Avenue.

References

1938 births
Living people
Footballers from Edinburgh
Penicuik Athletic F.C. players
Hibernian F.C. players
Falkirk F.C. players
Oldham Athletic A.F.C. players
Chester City F.C. players
Bradford (Park Avenue) A.F.C. players
Crystal Palace F.C. players
Gainsborough Trinity F.C. players
Scottish Football League players
English Football League players
Association football goalkeepers
Scottish footballers